Humboldt County is a county in the U.S. state of Iowa. As of the 2020 census, the population was 9,597. The county seat is Dakota City. The county was created in 1857 and named in honor of Alexander von Humboldt.

History

Founding
Iowa's entry to the union was approved by Congress on March 3, 1845, with statehood beginning on December 28, 1846, following approval of the state's constitution and boundaries. In order to establish county government across the state, the Iowa General Assembly passed an act on January 15, 1851, which created fifty counties in the half of the state where county government had not yet been established. Humboldt County was created by this act, containing its present area, as well as four townships in present-day Webster County: Jackson, Deer Creek, Badger, and Newark. It was named after Alexander von Humboldt. On January 21, 1855, an act merged the northern half of Humboldt County and Bancroft County into Kossuth County, with the southern half of Humboldt County merging into Webster County.

The Sixth General Assembly passed another act, reestablishing Humboldt County. The act was passed on  January 28, 1857, and went into effect on February 26. However, an error omitted the lower four townships (Jackson, Deer Creek, Badger, and Newark) from returning to Humboldt County. The error was not caught until the next session of the general assembly, and the general assembly passed a bill redefining Humboldt County to include the four townships on March 11, 1858. However, in the interceding time, the Constitution of Iowa came into effect, including the provision that "future laws altering county boundaries should be submitted to a vote of the people of the counties concerned and must be approved by them before going into effect". In a court case originating in the disputed area, the Iowa Supreme Court was asked to decide which county court had original jurisdiction. In their clarification, they ruled the March 11, 1858 clarification of Humboldt County's boundaries unconstitutional, as it had not been submitted to a public vote in the counties involved. In his decision, Chief Justice Ralph P. Lowe wrote, "We are compelled to conclude that township 90, in ranges 27 to 30, west of the 5th principal meridian, is still in and forms a part of Webster county. Of course we can pay no attention to conjectural surmises and vague suspicions, which have been made and entertained in relation to some unfairness which may have been practiced in the final passage of the act of 1857, creating the county of Humboldt. If such was the case, no evidence of the fact has been presented to us." The "vague suspicions" include a rumor that John Duncombe of Fort Dodge (namesake of Duncombe, Iowa and plaintiff in the lawsuit) had tricked Humboldt County into ceding the southern four townships to Webster County "on loan", or was otherwise responsible for the "error".

In 1872, Humboldt College was opened and closed in 1916 because there was no agreement with the county about taxation.

Geography

Unlike all counties to its east and west, Humboldt County has only 12 townships. Although founded with the standard 16 townships on January 15, 1851, the county was removed from existence in 1855.

Adjacent counties
Kossuth County  (north)
Wright County  (east)
Webster County  (south)
Pocahontas County  (west)

Ecology
 
Humboldt County is located entirely within the Des Moines Lobe of the Western Corn Belt Plains ecoregion, as defined by the United States Environmental Protection Agency (EPA). One of the flattest regions in Iowa, the Des Moines Lobe ecoregion is a distinctive area naturally defined by Wisconsin glaciation but modified by humans for extensive agriculture. In general, the land is level to gently rolling with some areas of relief defined by glacial features like moraines, hummocky knobs, and kettles, and outwash deposits. The lobe does not have any loess deposits like the Loess Hills to the west.

The stream network is poorly developed and widely spaced, with major rivers carving valleys that are relatively deep and steep-sided. Almost all of the natural lakes of Iowa are found in the northern part of this region (the Iowa Great Lakes). Most of the region has been converted from wet prairie to agricultural use with substantial surface water drainage. Only a small fraction of the wetlands remain, and many natural lakes have been drained as a result of agricultural drainage projects via drainage tiles or ditches.

Hydrology
Humboldt County is located within the Des Moines River watershed. The East and West Forks of the Des Moines River merge at Frank Gotch State Park in southern Humboldt County. The eastern part of Humboldt County is within the Boone River watershed, a tributary of the Des Moines.

Protected areas

While Humboldt County does not have any state parks, it has county parks. South of Humboldt is Frank A. Gotch County Park. It is named for Frank Gotch, a world-champion, undefeated wrestler from Humboldt. The park is near his childhood farm and is also home to the confluence of the East and West Forks of the Des Moines River. The park features campgrounds and a well-known converted railroad bridge used by the Minneapolis and St. Louis Railway. The bridge is part of the Three Rivers Trail, a converted rail route that runs from Eagle Grove west to Rolfe.

Near Bradgate is the Willow Access Area. The terrain is very wooded. In south Rutland is Rose Mill Park. The area can be used for camping and also has access to the Rutland Dam and West Fork of the Des Moines River. The dam is being restored, and most of the park is new. The river is known for its forested limestone bluffs and grassy banks.

Further downriver near Humboldt is Oxbow Park, which contains boating access ramps and much scenic open space. The park's southern border is Iowa Highway 3, and south of that is Joe Sheldon County Park. The park is split into two sections, one mostly for camping and one focused on recreation. There is access to the West Fork of the Des Moines River from the lower part of the park.

Continuing along the river, the Lake Nokomis area begins, popular for its woods and small ponds. The Cottonwood Trail also runs through the area.

West of Livermore, Lott's Park allows access to Lott's Creek. The park has many benches and picnic tables. South of Ottosen is the Ottosen Marsh State Game Management Area, colloquially the Ottosen Potholes. East of Dakota City is the Dakota City River Park, near an old dam and the Humboldt County Historical Museum. Near the unincorporated community of Pioneer is the Pioneer Prairie Pothole Wildlife Area.

Demographics

2020 census
There were 4,571 housing units, of which 4,073 were occupied.

2010 census
There were 4,684 housing units, of which 4,209 were occupied.

2000 census

As of the census of 2000, there were 10,381 people, 4,295 households, and 2,881 families residing in the county.  The population density was 24 people per square mile (9/km2).  There were 4,645 housing units at an average density of 11 per square mile (4/km2).  The racial makeup of the county was 98.63% White, 0.11% Black or African American, 0.06% Native American, 0.23% Asian, 0.10% Pacific Islander, 0.40% from other races, and 0.47% from two or more races.  0.96% of the population were Hispanic or Latino of any race.

There were 4,295 households, out of which 29.70% had children under the age of 18 living with them, 57.40% were married couples living together, 6.40% had a female householder with no husband present, and 32.90% were non-families. 29.80% of all households were made up of individuals, and 16.30% had someone living alone who was 65 years of age or older.  The average household size was 2.38 and the average family size was 2.94.

In the county, the population was spread out, with 24.90% under the age of 18, 7.00% from 18 to 24, 24.60% from 25 to 44, 22.50% from 45 to 64, and 21.00% who were 65 years of age or older.  The median age was 41 years. For every 100 females there were 95.70 males.  For every 100 females age 18 and over, there were 92.20 males.

The median income for a household in the county was $38,201, and the median income for a family was $46,510. Males had a median income of $31,004 versus $22,312 for females. The per capita income for the county was $18,300.  About 5.30% of families and 8.30% of the population were below the poverty line, including 13.80% of those under age 18 and 5.10% of those age 65 or over.

Communities

Cities

Bode
Bradgate
Dakota City
Gilmore City
Hardy
Humboldt
Livermore
Lu Verne
Ottosen
Renwick
Rutland
Thor

Unincorporated communities
Arnold
Pioneer

Ghost town
Unique

Townships

 Avery
 Beaver
 Corinth
 Delana
 Grove
 Humboldt
 Lake
 Norway
 Rutland
 Vernon
 Wacousta
 Weaver

Population ranking
The population ranking of the following table is based on the 2020 census of Humboldt County.

† county seat

Politics

Infrastructure

Major highways
 U.S. Highway 169
 Iowa Highway 3
 Iowa Highway 15
 Iowa Highway 17
Humboldt County routes

See also

National Register of Historic Places listings in Humboldt County, Iowa

References

External links

Humboldt County website

 
1857 establishments in Iowa
Populated places established in 1857
Alexander von Humboldt